The 2002 Barbarians end of season tour was a series of matches played in May–June 2002 in Scotland, Wales, England by Barbarian F.C.

Results 

2002
2002 rugby union tours
2001–02 in Scottish rugby union
2001–02 in Welsh rugby union
2001–02 in English rugby union
May 2002 sports events in the United Kingdom
June 2002 sports events in the United Kingdom